Lycette Darsonval (born Alice Andrée Marie Perron, 12 February 1912 – 1 November 1996) was a French ballet dancer.

She visited Noël Corbu in Rennes-le-Château with the artist Jean Raffy Le Persan (1920-2008) during the 1950s.

Biography
Lycette Darsonval is the half-sister of dancer Serge Perrault. Dancer in the street in Montmartre, she was spotted and entered the Paris Opera at the age of 23, where, a pupil of Nicola Guerra, she became one of the most prominent performers of the "Lifar generation", promoted to the rank as a prima ballerina in 1940. The title of star not being official until 1941, Solange Schwarz and Lycette Darsonval were the first dancers to bear this title.

Two bronzes by Jacques Gestalder representing Lycette Darsonval are exhibited at the Bettencourt-Schueller foundation in Neuilly-sur-Seine.

A portrait of Lycette Darsonval was painted by Serge Ivanoff.

Bibliography
 Martine Cadieu, Lycette Darsonval, Paris, Presses littéraires de France, collection "Danseurs et danseuses", 1951, 19 p. (notice BnF no  FRBNF31896532)
 Lycette Darsonval, Ma vie sur les pointes, Ed. France-Empire, 1988
 Louis Léon-Martin, Les demoiselles d'Opéra, Éditions des portiques, 1930
 Serge Lifar, Les mémoires d'Icare, Sauret, 1993
 Florence Poudru, Serge Lifar: la danse pour patrie, Hermann, 2007
 Gilbert Serres, Coulisses de la danse, France-Europe Ed., 2005

References

External links

1912 births
1996 deaths
French ballerinas
Darsonval
20th-century French women